Verhofstadt is a surname. Notable people with the surname include:

 Dirk Verhofstadt (born 1955), Belgian liberal thinker 
 Guy Verhofstadt (born 1953), Belgian politician, brother of Dirk

Dutch-language surnames